The following is a list of offers made on the British reality television series Dragons' Den in Series 11-20, aired during 2013-2023. As of 2022, 104 episodes of Dragons' Den were broadcast consisting of at least 754 pitches. A total of 129 pitches were successful, with 26 offers from the dragons rejected by the entrepreneurs and 599 failing to receive an offer of investment.

Series overview

Successful pitches

Series 11

Series 12

Series 13

Series 14

Series 15

Series 16

Series 17

Series 18

Series 19

Series 20

Rejected offers

Series 11

Series 12

Series 13

Series 14

Series 15

Series 16

Series 17

Series 18

Series 19

Series 20

Failed Pitches

Series 11

Series 12

Series 13

Series 14

Series 15

Series 16

Series 17

Series 18

Series 19

Series 20

References

British television-related lists